The Lexington Fire Department provides fire prevention, firefighting, emergency medical services, technical rescue, hazardous materials, aircraft firefighting, and dive rescue operations to the 324,604 people who live in the 284 square miles of Fayette County, Kentucky. All of LFD's firefighters are at least EMTs, and more than 220 of them are Paramedics.

History 

The Lexington Fire Department was formed in 1775 to protect the city of Lexington, Kentucky. In 1864, the Lexington career Fire Department was formed. In 1973, the Fayette County and Lexington governments merged, combining the county and city fire departments. Today, the Lexington Fire Department provides fire and EMS services to nearly 286 square miles and 324,604 people. The Lexington Fire Department is also the largest single fire department in Kentucky.

Organization and operations

Organization 
The Lexington Fire Department is organized into 5 battalions, or "districts", each commanded by a District Major. Each shift has a Shift Commander, who is in charge of all 5 District Commanders and the units underneath them. Above the shift commander, there are various commands staff personnel, including Fire Chief Jason Wells. Most of the department's offices are at its headquarters station, Firehouse 1.

Stations and apparatus 

Note that vehicles with a * are cross-staffed by the companies/personnel at its station.

Operations 
The Lexington Fire Department provides fire & EMS services, in addition to hazardous materials, technical rescue, aircraft firefighting, dive rescue, and fire prevention services. All of Lexington Fire Department's Engine Companies are paramedic engines.

EMS operations 
Lexington Fire Department operates 12 full-time ALS ambulances, in addition to 3 cross-staffed ALS ambulances, that are cross-staffed when the call volume surges.

Vehicle extrication operations 
Lexington Fire Department's automotive-extrication services are provided by the department's Ladder Companies, and Rescue 1.

Special operations 
Many of LFD's companies are special operations companies, and are trained in some type of special operations. These companies are strategically located throughout Fayette county. The two special operations teams are the Hazmat Operations Team, and the Technical Rescue Operations Team

Hazardous materials operations 
Lexington Fire Department's Hazmat Operations Team is composed of multiple companies around the city. These companies will be dispatched to hazmat incidents around the city that require more/additional/other equipment not kept on other companies. The companies that make up the team are:
 Engine 2
Engine 6
Engine 10
Engine 20 (cross-staffs Hazmat 1)
Ladder 3
Tower 4 (cross-staffs Hazmat 1)
Ladder 5
Hazmat 1
Hazmat trailers (prolonged operations equipment in multiple specialized trailers
Car 220 (Hazmat Operations Team Commander/RIT Officer)

Technical rescue operations 
Lexington Fire Department's Technical Rescue Operations Team is composed of multiple companies around the city. These companies will be dispatched to technical rescue incidents around the city Companies that make up the team that require more/additional/other equipment not kept on other companies. The Technical Rescue Operations Team will often respond to assist departments in neighboring counties with complex technical rescue situations, such as large animal (i.e. horses) rescue incidents. The companies that make up the team are:
Engine 8
 Engine 9 (dive rescue operations company)
 Engine 12
 Engine 13
 Rescue 1
Rescue 2 (reserve rescue/collapse unit)
Collapse Truck 1 (collapse unit)
Confined space rescue equipment trailer
Trench rescue equipment trailer
Car 230 (Technical Rescue Operations Team Commander)
These engine companies and Rescue 1 also provide RIT operations.

Support & other operations 
Lexington Fire Department also maintains several support apparatus for various incident types where they might be needed. Engine 23 is an Aircraft Rescue Firefighting-equipped engine company. This is to protect aircraft operations of an aviation industry located at the site of the former Bluegrass Station Army Depot, where Station 23 is located.

 Engine 23 (ARFF-Equipped Company)
 Brush Truck 1
 Brush Truck 2
 Mobile Air 1
 Mobile Command Center
 Mass Casualty Ambulance Bus

References 

1775 establishments in the Thirteen Colonies
Organizations based in Lexington, Kentucky
Fire departments in Kentucky
Organizations established in 1775